Anne Wales Abbott or, Abbot (April 10, 1808 – June 1, 1908) was a game designer, magazine editor, literary reviewer, and author.

Life
Abbott was born on 10 April 1808, the daughter of Reverend Abiel Abbott, a Beverly, Massachusetts, clergyman, and Eunice Abbott.

Abbott designed the hugely popular card game Dr. Busby, which was published by W. & S. B. Ives of Salem, Massachusetts, on March 7, 1843. It sold 15,000 copies in its first eighteen months.

Abbott authored her second game The Game of the Races which was sold in Salem, Mass. through J. P. Jewett on January 13, 1844. The Game of the Races was not published by W. & S. B. Ives as it is not advertised with other published W. & S. B. Ives games in her book, DOCTOR BUSBY AND HIS NEIGHBORS which was typeset by November 24, 1844 but not released for sale until December 28, 1844.

She released her third game Master Rodbury, on September 14, 1844. This time she again used W. & S. B. Ives as the publisher.

Abbott published her first book, WILLIE ROGERS sometime before November 24, 1844, quickly followed by her second book, DOCTOR BUSBY AND HIS NEIGHBORS on December 28, 1844.

Before 1991 Anne Wales Abbott was credited for authoring The Mansion of Happiness board game which was released by W. & S. B. Ives on November 24, 1843 or 1832. The Mansion of Happiness was originally released in England in 1800, and authored by George W. M. Fox. She may have collaborated with S. B. (Stephen Bradshaw) Ives, but neither Anne nor Stephen, authored the W. & S. B. Ives published version which was an almost exact copy of the English game.

Before 1992 Abbott was credited for authoring the extremely long-lasting card game of Authors which was published in 1861 by A. Augustus Smith of G. M. Whipple and A. A. Smith. They were also publishers in Salem, Mass. but the publishing house was one block away from the original W. & S. B. Ives bookstore at 230 Essex Street. That bookstore and publishing house, 232 Essex Street were now owned by Henry P. Ives, S. B. Ives's son. Actually, the game of Authors was invented by "a coterie of bright young ladies" of Salem and presented by a gentleman to A. Augustus Smith for publication. By 1861, Anne Abbott would have been in her fifties, not fitting the description of the designers of Authors.

In July 1850, Abbott reviewed Hawthorne's The Scarlet Letter for the North American Review, declaring she liked the preface better than the tale. Abbott disapproved of Hawthorne's subject matter and believed he had allowed his good judgement to be carried away by "the magic power of the style."  Hawthorne referred to Abbott as one of that "damned mob of scribbling women."

Abbott served gratuitously as editor (1851–1858) of The Child's Friend, a literary journal for young people.  Profits from the publication were directed to the relief of indigent and neglected children.

In 1853, Abbott's Autumn Leaves: Original Pieces in Prose and Verse was published by John Bartlett of Cambridge.  Children's books by Abbott include Doctor Busby and His Neighbors, Kate and Lizzie, or Six Months Out of School, Lost Wheelbarrow and Other Stories, and The Tamed and the Untamed and Other Stories.

Abbott died in Cambridge, Massachusetts, on 1 June 1908.

References

External links
 
 
 
 Complete text of Abbot's Autumn Leaves: Original Pieces in Prose and Verse.
 BoardGameGeek: Dr. Busby

1808 births
1908 deaths
American centenarians
Board game designers
Writers from Massachusetts
American game designers
Women centenarians